Niv Acosta (born May 1988) is a transgender American dancer, choreographer and artist. His project Discotropic was featured in the Triennial at the New Museum in 2015. Acosta aims to address larger modern concepts through his work and his work revolves around race and performance.

Early life and education 
Acosta was born in the Washington Heights neighborhood of Manhattan in New York City, to a 15 year old single Black Dominican mother. He majored in dance at Washington Irving High School under the direction of Leslie Zema. In 2005 and 2006, he attended the Martha Graham School of Contemporary Dance as a scholarship student. After graduation, he began studying dance and choreography at the California Institute of the Arts in Los Angeles. In the summer holidays, Acosta attended American Dance Festival at Duke University, where he began to find his voice as a choreographer. Between 2009 and 2010, Acosta took a break from dance to discover himself, and came out as transgender, as he began to understand why it had felt hard to identify as a female dancer. Acosta began to choreograph again in 2010, and moved back to New York soon after.

Career 
During his years at the California Institute of the Arts, he choreographed two denzel pieces, which drew inspiration from Denzel Washington. After moving back to New York, he began working on a third one, denzel superstructure. In 2011, Acosta auditioned for Fresh Tracks at New York Live Arts and started working on another incarnation of denzel. He became a resident artist at New York Live Arts by the end of 2011, and presented his first draft of the 5th denzel piece, denzel mini petite  happymeal. This piece was later premiered at Brooklyn Arts Exchange in March 2012. During summer 2012, Acosta began developing the final incarnation of the denzel series – i shot denzel. He successfully launched a Kickstarter campaign for the world premiere of i shot denzel on January 30, 2014, and he later commented that "the exposure from the premiere skyrocketed his career in ways invaluable".

For his piece Discotropic featured in the Triennial at the New Museum, Acosta was inspired by the made for TV film that appeared in 1978, Star Wars Holiday Special. During the making of the film, donors and actors demanded that a black person be cast in the film, so the network CBS cast Diahann Carroll to appear as a hologram. Inspired by this figure, Acosta lip-synced the words Carroll's character, Mermeia, sang in the film. Speaking to Vice Magazine, Acosta says that through this reperformance of the piece, he explores sci-fi film with a "specific focus on Black American experience, and then how I see and rework that as a queer, trans-identified person in the contemporary world."

niv Acosta and Fannie Sosa: Black Power Naps was created in 2018 for an exhibition at Matadero Madrid during Madrid Pride. It was remounted in 2019 for Performance Space New York, won a 2019 Creative Capital Award. The exhibition focused on the "Sleep Gap" between white and racialized people, whereby people of colour are statistically getting less sleep than white people. The artists created a venue of soft, luxurious, comfortable spaces where people of colour were invited to enjoy the rest that is often withheld as privilege. The piece was one of the first works to be covered by Performa Reports, a weekly performance art review from Performa. It was referenced as a conceptual influence on Solange's 2019 album When I get Home.

In addition to the 2019 Creative Capital Award, Acosta is a 2017 Louis Comfort Tiffany Foundation grant awardee.

Concepts

denzel
The denzel series was inspired by Denzel Washington. Acosta was interested in him as a black male actor in mainstream media, and saw him as radical and empowering. Acosta's denzel provided context for his complex male identity.

"Impossible Bodies"

Works
 Discotropic, New Museum Triennial, 2015
The denzel series
 denzel
 denzel prelude
 denzel superstructure, the Community Education Center in Philadelphia, 2010
 denzel again, New York Live Arts, 2011
 denzel minipetite b a t h t u b happymeal, Upstart Festival at Brooklyn Arts Exchange, 2012
 i shot denzel, New York Live Arts, 2014

References

External links
 
  on Vimeo

Living people
Artists from New York City
California Institute of the Arts alumni
1988 births
21st-century American artists
American contemporary artists
Transgender dancers
21st-century African-American artists
20th-century African-American people